is a railway line in Japan operated by Kyushu Railway Company (JR Kyushu). It connects Keisen Station in Keisen, Fukuoka with Yoshizuka Station in Fukuoka, Fukuoka.

Stations

History
The Kyushu Railway Co. opened the Yoshizuka - Sasaguri section in 1904, and extended it to Hakata with a line paralleling the Kagoshima Main Line the following year. The company was nationalised in 1907. 

In 1911 the Kagoshima Main line was duplicated utilising the parallel line, and the junction between the lines became Yoshizuka. Petrol railcars were introduced on the line in 1936.

In 1968 the line was extended from Sasaguri to Katsura (on the Chikuho Main Line), with freight services commencing on that section in 1970. Freight service on the entire line ceased in 1984.

The line was electrified in 2001.

Former connecting lines
Yusu Station: The 14 km Katsuta Line was opened by the Chikuzen Sangu Railway Co. to Chikuzenkatsuta between 1918 and 1919. A connection to Sakado on the Kashii Line opened in 1942, and the line was nationalised in 1944. Freight service ceased in 1981, and the line closed in 1985.

See also
 Fukuhoku Yutaka Line

References

Lines of Kyushu Railway Company
1067 mm gauge railways in Japan
Railway lines opened in 1904